Old Crow is a brand of bourbon whiskey.

Old Crow may also refer to:

 Old Crow, Yukon, Canada, a community
 Vuntut Gwitchin (electoral district), Yukon, formerly known as Old Crow
 Old Crow River, which flows from Alaska to Yukon
 "Old Crow", a nickname for Allied World War II electronic warfare personnel – see Association of Old Crows
 Old Crow, a long-established public house in Brentry, England

See also
 Old Crow Flats, Yukon, a wetland
 Old Crows / Young Cardinals, a 2009 album by post-hardcore band Alexisonfire